Leavell is a surname. Notable people with the surname include:

Allen Leavell (born 1957), American basketball player 
Byrd Leavell, American literary agent
Carroll Leavell (born 1936), American politician
Chuck Leavell (born 1952), American musician
Fin Leavell, American singer-songwriter
Linda Leavell, American writer